This article presents a set of paradigms—that is, conjugation tables—of Spanish verbs, including examples of regular verbs and some of the most common irregular verbs. For other irregular verbs and their common patterns, see the article on Spanish irregular verbs.

The tables include only the "simple" tenses (that is, those formed with a single word), and not the "compound" tenses (those formed with an auxiliary verb plus a non-finite form of the main verb), such as the progressive, perfect, and passive voice. The progressive aspects (also called "continuous tenses") are formed by using the appropriate tense of estar + gerund, and the perfect constructions are formed by using the appropriate tense of haber + past participle. When the past participle is used in this way, it invariably ends with -o. In contrast, when the participle is used as an adjective, it agrees in gender and number with the noun modified. Similarly, the participle agrees with the subject when it is used with ser to form the "true" (dynamic) passive voice (e.g. La carta fue escrita ayer 'The letter was written [got written] yesterday.'), and also when it is used with estar to form a "passive of result", or stative passive (as in La carta ya está escrita 'The letter is already written.').

The pronouns yo, tú, vos, él, nosotros, vosotros and ellos are used to symbolise the three persons and two numbers. Note, however, that Spanish is a pro-drop language, and so it is the norm to omit subject pronouns when not needed for contrast or emphasis. The subject, if specified, can easily be something other than these pronouns. For example, él, ella, or usted can be replaced by a noun phrase, or the verb can appear with impersonal se and no subject (e.g. Aquí se vive bien, 'One lives well here'). The first-person plural expressions nosotros, nosotras, tú y yo, or él y yo can be replaced by a noun phrase that includes the speaker (e.g. Los estudiantes tenemos hambre, 'We students are hungry'). The same comments hold for vosotros and ellos.

Regular verbs

-ar conjugation (amar, 'to love')

-er conjugation (temer, 'to fear')

-ir conjugation (partir, 'to split/depart')

Irregular verbs

ser, 'to be (in essence)'
This is an Oy-Yo verb.
Stem: s-, fu-, er-, se-. 

There are two ways to say "To be" in Spanish: ser and estar. They both mean "to be", but they are used in different ways. As a rule of thumb, ser is used to describe permanent or almost permanent conditions and estar to describe temporary ones.

estar, 'to be (in a state)'

haber, 'to have (aux.)'
Stem: hab-, h-, habr-, hay-, hub- (a-u)

tener, 'to have (possession)'
This is a G-Verb.

ir, 'to go'

conocer, 'to know (to be acquainted with); to get acquainted with'

conducir, 'to drive'
This is a -ducir verb.

See also
Spanish verbs

References

External links
How is my Spanish: Spanish conjugation charts  Spanish conjugation chart. Chart to conjugate in 7 different Spanish tenses.
SpanishBoat: Verb conjugation worksheets in all Spanish tenses Printable and online exercises for teachers and students...
Espagram: verb conjugator  Spanish verb conjugator. Contains about a million verb forms.

Conjugation
Indo-European verbs